L. laeta may refer to:

 Lambdina laeta, a geometer moth
 Leptothyra laeta, a sea snail
 Leunisia laeta, a plant with a pseudanthium
 Liloa laeta, a haminoeid bubble snail
 Loxosceles laeta, a recluse spider
 Lycosa laeta, a wolf spider